is a Japanese professional boxer. He is a three-weight world champion, having held the WBO mini-flyweight title from 2015 to 2016; the WBO junior-flyweight title from 2016 to 2017; and the WBO flyweight title from 2018 to 2020. Upon winning his first world title in only his fifth bout, he became the fastest Japanese fighter ever to become a world champion. Along with Vasyl Lomachenko, he is also the fastest ever fighter to win titles in three weight-classes, having accomplished the feat in only 12 bouts.

Amateur career 
As a child, Tanaka suffered from Legg–Calvé–Perthe disease. Despite this, he took up boxing and won four national high school tournaments competing as an amateur in the junior-flyweight division. At the continental and international level he was a quarter-finalist at the 2012 Youth World Championships and a silver medalist at the 2013 ASBC Asian Confederation Youth Boxing Championships. At Chukyo Highschool he trained under former OPBF super flyweight champion Hideyasu Ishihara. He finished his amateur career with a record of 46-5 (13 KO/RSC). He was not stopped during his amateur career.

Pro career

Mini-flyweight
Tanaka turned pro at the age of 18 in 2013. In November 2014, Tanaka defeated previously unbeaten Ryuji Hara via tenth-round technical knockout (TKO) to win the OPBF mini-flyweight title. In his next fight, Tanaka decisioned Julian Yedras (117–111, 117–111, 115–113) to win the WBO mini-flyweight title. Tanaka holds the Japanese record for winning a world title in the fewest fights (five), surpassing the previous record held by Naoya Inoue of six fights. Tanaka's only title defense at mini-flyweight came against Vic Saludar, whom he knocked out in round six after a left hook to the body. Saludar knocked down Tanaka in round six, and was ahead on all scorecards prior to the stoppage.

Junior-flyweight
In December 2016, Tanaka challenged former mini-flyweight title holder Moisés Fuentes for the WBO junior-flyweight title. Tanaka dominated Fuentes, dropping him in round five before referee Raul Caiz Jr stopped the fight, giving Tanaka a TKO victory. With the win, Tanaka became a two-weight world champion in just eight fights. Tanaka's first defense came against prospect Ángel Acosta. The former won a wide unanimous decision (UD) (117–110, 117–110, 116–111) and dropped Acosta once. Acosta had won all 16 of his previous fights by knockout.

Tanaka's second defense took place in September 2017 against little-known fighter Palangpol CP Freshmart. Tanaka was a huge favorite going into the fight, but Palangpol would prove to be Tanaka's toughest challenger so far, dropping the defending champion once in the first round and trading back-and-forth combinations for the rest of the bout. After a thrilling fight, Tanaka would finally gain the upper hand in round nine, as he knocked down Palangpol and continued to land big combinations as the challenger struggled to connect. Eventually, the referee stepped in and stopped the fight at 1:52 in round nine.

Tanaka had previously sought a unification bout against WBA titleholder Ryoichi Taguchi in December, but injuries during the fight against Palangpol would prevent him from fighting on that date.

Flyweight
In December 2017, Tanaka vacated his junior-flyweight title to move to the flyweight division. In September 2018, Tanaka defeated Sho Kimura to capture the WBO flyweight title, equalling Vasyl Lomachenko's record of becoming a three-weight world champion in just 12 fights.

In March 2019, Tanaka fought former WBA, IBF, lineal and The Ring junior flyweight champion and domestic rival Ryoichi Taguchi for the first defense of his WBO flyweight title in a one sided bout described as "action packed" by spectators. After the fight, Tanaka expressed regret that he did not deliver a knockout.

In August 2019, Tanaka fought Jonathan González after losing on all three judge's scorecards leading up to the seventh round, Tanaka delivered a brutal knock out to make a second successful defense of his WBO flyweight title.

On New Year's Eve in 2019, Tanaka fought Wulan Tuolehazi, Tanaka delivered a brutal third-round knockout after a one sided fight to defend his WBO flyweight title for the third time. Shortly after the bout, he vacated his WBO flyweight title, announcing that he intended to fight Kazuto Ioka for his WBO super flyweight title.

Super-flyweight
Tanaka faced WBO super flyweight champion Kazuto Ioka on New Year's Eve 2020 in an attempt to win a major title in four divisions in the fewest fights. He would have become the second Japanese champion to win a major title in four divisions if he was victorious, the first being his opponent, Ioka. After a competitive first four rounds in which Tanaka was the aggressor and Ioka found success with counter punches, Ioka dropped his opponent in the fifth round with a counter left hook. With about a minute left in the sixth round, he again knocked Tanaka down. In the eighth round, Ioka caught his opponent with another hard counter left hook, and referee Michiaki Someya caught Tanaka before he could fall and waved off the fight, with Ioka inflicting Tanaka with his first professional loss and retaining his WBO title via eighth-round technical knockout.

Tanaka was booked to face the one-time WBA super-flyweight title challenger Sho Ishida on 11 December 2021, at the International Conference Hall in Nagoya, Japan. He won the fight by split decision, with two judges awarding him a 96-94 and 96-95 scorecard respectively, while the third judge scored the fight 96-94 for Ishida.

Tanaka faced the reigning OPBF and WBO Asia Pacific super flyweight champion Masayoshi Hashizume, for the latter title, at the Korakuen Hall in Tokyo, Japan on 29 June 2022. The fight headlined the "89th Phoenix Battle" and was broadcast by Hikari TV. Tanaka won the fight by a fifth-round technical knockout. Tanaka vacated the WBO Asia Pacific title on 23 August 2022.

Tanaka is going to face Yanga Sigqibo on 11 December 2022, at the Takeda Teva Ocean Arena in Nagoya, Japan.

Personal life 
Tanaka balanced professional boxing with school and in 2019 graduated with a degree in economics from Chukyo University. He is the cousin of Japanese figure skater Yuhana Yokoi and younger brother of amateur fighter Ryomei Tanaka. He said that he admires Naoya Inoue in an interview with The Japan Times.

Professional boxing record

See also 
List of boxing triple champions
List of WBO world champions
List of minimumweight boxing champions
List of light flyweight boxing champions
List of flyweight boxing champions
List of Japanese boxing world champions
Boxing in Japan

References

External links 
 
 Asian Boxing Profile of Tanaka

1995 births
Living people
Mini-flyweight boxers
Light-flyweight boxers
Flyweight boxers
Japanese male boxers
Sportspeople from Gifu Prefecture
World Boxing Organization champions
World mini-flyweight boxing champions
World light-flyweight boxing champions
World flyweight boxing champions